Slippers are light footwear that are easy to put on and off and are intended to be worn indoors, particularly at home. They provide comfort and protection for the feet when walking indoors.

History
The recorded history of slippers can be traced back to the 12th century. In the  West, the record can only be traced to 1478.

Slippers in China date from 4700 BCE. They were made of cotton or woven rush, had leather linings, and featured symbols of power, such as dragons.

Native American moccasins were also highly decorative. Such moccasins depicted nature scenes and were embellished with beadwork and fringing, their soft sure-footedness made them suitable for indoors appropriation. Inuit and Aleut people made shoes from smoked hare-hide to protect their feet against the frozen ground inside their homes.

Fashionable Orientalism saw the introduction into the West of designs like the baboosh.

 Victorian people needed such shoes to keep the dust and gravel outside their homes. For  Victorian ladies slippers gave an opportunity to show off their needlepoint skills and use embroidery as decoration.

Types

Types of slippers include:
Open-heel slippers – usually made with a fabric upper layer that encloses the top of the foot and the toes, but leaves the heel open. These are often distributed in expensive hotels, included with the cost of the room.
Closed slippers – slippers with a heel guard that prevents the foot from sliding out.
Slipper boots – slippers meant to look like boots. Often favored by women, they are typically furry boots with a fleece or soft lining, and a soft rubber sole. Modeled after sheepskin boots, they may be worn outside.
Sandal slippers – cushioned sandals with soft rubber or fabric soles, similar to Birkenstock's cushioned sandals.
 Evening slipper, also known as the "Prince Albert" slipper in reference to Albert, Prince Consort. It is made of velvet with leather soles and features a grosgrain bow or the wearer’s initials embroidered in gold.

Some slippers are made to resemble something other than a slipper and are sold as a novelty item. The slippers are usually made from soft and colorful materials and may come in the shapes of animals, animal paws, vehicles, cartoon characters, etc.

Not all shoes with a soft fluffy interior are slippers. Any shoe with a rubber sole and laces is a normal outdoor shoe. In India, rubber chappals (flip-flops) are worn as indoor shoes.

In popular culture
The fictional character Cinderella is said to have worn glass slippers; in modern parlance, they would probably be called glass high heels. This motif was introduced in Charles Perrault's 1697 version of the fairy tale, "Cendrillon ou la petite pantoufle de verre" "Cinderella, or The Little Glass Slipper". For some years it was debated that this detail was a mistranslation and the slippers in the story were instead made of fur (French: vair), but this interpretation has since been discredited by folklorists.

Derek "The Slipper Man" Fan holds the Guinness World Records record for wearing a pair of dress slippers for 23 years straight as of June 30, 2007.

A pair of ruby slippers worn by Judy Garland in The Wizard of Oz sold at Christie's in June 1988 for $165,000. The same pair was resold in May 2000 for $666,000. On both occasions they were the most expensive shoes from a film to be sold at auction.

In Hawaii and many islands of The Caribbean, slippers, or "slippahs" is used for describing flip-flops.

The term "house shoes" (elided into how-shuze) is common in the American South.

See also
 Bunny slippers
 Moccasins
 Lady's slipper orchids
 Ruby slippers
 Slip-on shoe
 Slippering (punishment)
 Uwabaki
 mahabis

References

External links

Footwear
Shoes